Daler Imomnazarov ((), born 31 May 1995) is a Tajikistani professional football player for Tajik side Istiklol and the Tajikistan national team.

Career

Club
On 19 July 2021, Istiklol announced that Imomnazarov had joined the club on trial, signing with the club permanently on 7 August 2021 on a contract until the end of 2023.

Career statistics

Club

International

Statistics accurate as of match played 25 September 2022

Honors
Istiklol
 Tajikistan Higher League (1):2022
 Tajikistan Cup (1): 2022
Tajikistan
King's Cup: 2022

References

1995 births
Living people
Tajikistani footballers
Tajikistan international footballers
Association football defenders